Sun Beibei (born 28 January 1984 in Shandong, China) is a Chinese-born Singaporean former table tennis player. She occupies the 20th place in the ITTF women's world ranking, as of October 2011.

Career records
Singles (as of 31 July 2010)
World Championships: round of 32 (2007, 09).
Pro Tour winner (1): India Open 2007. Runner-up (1): Croatian Open 2005.
Pro Tour Grand Finals appearances: 4. Record: QF (2008).
Asian Games: round of 16 (2006).
Asian Championships: round of 16 (2007, 09).

Women's doubles
World Championships: round of 16 (2009).
Pro Tour winner (4): Russian, German Open 2006; India Open 2007; Singapore Open 2008. Runner-up (8): Korea, Chinese Taipei, China (Shenzhen) Open 2005; Slovenian Open 2006; Chinese Taipei Open 2007; Kuwait, Brazil, Chile Open 2008.
Pro Tour Grand Finals appearances: 4. Record: winner (2008), SF (2005, 06, 09).
Asian Games: QF (2006).
Asian Championships: SF (2007).

Mixed doubles
World Championships: round of 32 (2007).

Teams
World Championships: 1st (2010); 2nd (2008).
World Team Cup: 2nd (2009).
Asian Games: 2nd (2006).
Asian Championships: 2nd (2007, 09).

Medals

See also
 List of table tennis players

References

Singaporean female table tennis players
Chinese female table tennis players
Living people
Commonwealth Games gold medallists for Singapore
Table tennis players at the 2010 Commonwealth Games
1984 births
Asian Games medalists in table tennis
Table tennis players at the 2006 Asian Games
Table tennis players at the 2010 Asian Games
Medalists at the 2006 Asian Games
Medalists at the 2010 Asian Games
Asian Games silver medalists for Singapore
Commonwealth Games medallists in table tennis
Chinese emigrants to Singapore
Singaporean sportspeople of Chinese descent
Naturalised citizens of Singapore
Table tennis players from Shandong
Sportspeople from Zibo
Naturalised table tennis players
Southeast Asian Games medalists in table tennis
Medallists at the 2010 Commonwealth Games